Rosenthal is a small town in southeast Waldeck-Frankenberg district in Hesse, Germany.

Geography

Location
Rosenthal lies in the Burgwald range 11 km southeast of Frankenberg and 18 km northeast of Marburg.

Neighbouring communities
Rosenthal borders in the north on the community of Burgwald, in the east on the town of Gemünden (both in Waldeck-Frankenberg), in the southeast on the community of Wohratal, in the south on the towns of Rauschenberg and Wetter, and in the west on the community of Münchhausen (all in Marburg-Biedenkopf).

Constituent communities
Besides the main town, which bears the same name as the whole, the town of Rosenthal consists of the centres of Roda and Willershausen.

History
Rosenthal was founded in 1327 as a Mainz town and outpost in the dispute over the Hessian fief, but nevertheless passed to the Landgraviate of Hesse in 1464.

In 1688, the town achieved dubious fame by being the scene of Hesse's last witch burnings.

In 1866, Rosenthal passed, along with the rest of the Electorate of Hesse, to Prussia.

Amalgamations
As part of Hesse's municipal reforms in the early 1970s, the heretofore independent communities of Roda and Willershausen were amalgamated with Rosenthal.

Politics

Town council

The town council's 15 seats are apportioned thus, in accordance with municipal elections held on 26 March 2006:

Note: Bürgerliste Roda is a citizens' coalition.

Mayor
At the mayoral election on 26 September 2021, Stefan Jakob was elected Rosenthal's mayor with a 82% share of the vote.

Coat of arms
Rosenthal's civic coat of arms might heraldically be described thus: In gules a six-spoked wheel argent surrounded per square by four roses Or with centres azure and sepals vert.

This describes the arms shown in this article, and also seen at the town's official website. At least one source, however, describes a different composition with three stemmed roses growing out of the top of the wheel.

The wheel is the Wheel of Mainz, symbolizing the town's founders.

Literature
 Fritz Himmelmann: Heimatbuch der Stadt Rosenthal

References

External links

1327 establishments in Europe
Populated places established in the 1320s
Waldeck-Frankenberg